Andrey Nevskiy (born 19 March 1993) is a Russian ice dancer. Competing for Latvia with Olga Jakušina, he is the 2015 Volvo Open Cup silver medalist and 2014 Tallinn Trophy bronze medalist. They competed at three World Championships.

Personal life
Nevskiy was born on 19 March 1993 in Moscow. In July 2018, he married Russian single skater Anna Pogorilaya.

Career

Early years 
Nevskiy began learning to skate in 1999. In the 2010–2011 season, he competed on the junior level with Amelie Mepillat for France.

He began his partnership with Tatiana Baturintseva in the 2011–2012 season. Representing Russia in the senior ranks, they placed 4th at the 2012 Ice Star and 16th at the 2012 Golden Spin of Zagreb. They finished 8th at the 2013 Russian Championships.

Partnership with Jakušina 
In 2014, Nevskiy teamed up with Olga Jakušina to compete for Latvia. They decided to train under Svetlana Alexeeva, Elena Kustarova, and Olga Riabinina in Moscow. After winning bronze at the Tallinn Trophy in December 2014, they placed 26th at the 2015 European Championships in Stockholm, Sweden, and 29th at the 2015 World Championships in Shanghai, China.

Jakušina/Nevskiy received the silver medal at the Volvo Open Cup in November 2015. They ranked 22nd at the 2016 European Championships in Bratislava, Slovakia, and 29th at the 2016 World Championships in Boston, United States.

The duo placed 23rd at the 2017 European Championships in Ostrava, Czech Republic, and 29th at the 2017 World Championships in Helsinki, Finland.

Following the 2016–2017 season, Jakušina/Nevskiy decided to be coached by Alexander Zhulin in Moscow.

Programs 
 With Jakušina

Competitive highlights 
CS: Challenger Series

With Jakušina for Latvia

With Baturintseva for Russia

With Mepillat for France

References

External links 
 

1993 births
Living people
Russian male ice dancers
Figure skaters from Moscow